The Truth About De-Evolution (full title: In The Beginning Was The End: The Truth About De-Evolution) is a  9-minute short film written by Gerald Casale and Mark Mothersbaugh, for the band Devo, and directed by Chuck Statler.  Filmed in May 1976, it contains two separate songs: "Secret Agent Man" and "Jocko Homo". It won First Prize at the Ann Arbor Film Festival in 1977, and was routinely screened before Devo live concerts. It is included as an extra on the Criterion Collection's release of Island of Lost Souls (1932). Stills from the film were used for the front and back cover of European releases and the inner sleeve of American releases of Q: Are We Not Men? A: We Are Devo! in 1978.

Synopsis

The film begins with an extreme close-up of a television, switching between channels while odd gibberish noises play in the background. The film title is superimposed over the television screen.

The scene fades to a shot of a factory (filmed at the Goodyear World of Rubber in Akron, Ohio). Members of Devo in its quartet stage are seen in blue workmen's suits, operating machinery, until one notices it is time to go. All the band members wear clear face masks, except for Mark Mothersbaugh, who appears in his Booji Boy mask. The members leave work and get into a car. They pull up in front of the burned out Kent bar The Water Street Saloon which was two buildings down from JB's in Kent, Ohio. The next clip shows them entering the front door of JB's, carrying instruments. A sign on the door reads "Tonight: 15-60-75", a reference to the Numbers Band, which Gerald Casale played bass for at one point. The "Secret Agent Man" performance begins, featuring Bob Mothersbaugh on guitar, Gerald Casale on bass, Jim Mothersbaugh on electric bongos, and Mark Mothersbaugh/Booji Boy on synthesizers. The performance routinely cuts away to bizarre visuals, such as two men in monkey masks spanking a woman with ping-pong paddles, or a punk playing a double-neck guitar plugged into a space heater. The segment ends with a fadeout of Mark Mothersbaugh in a John F. Kennedy mask with a painted on bullet wound.

The "Jocko Homo" segment begins with Booji Boy running through a parking lot off of Front Street in Cuyahoga Falls. He enters a building through the fire escape to meet with General Boy. They exchange papers, and General Boy makes a statement: "In the past this information has been suppressed, but now it can be told. Every man, woman, and mutant on this planet shall know the truth about de-evolution." Booji replies with "Oh, dad, we're all devo!"

A series of rapid-fire cuts of the letters in "DEVO" appears (with the music of "Mechanical Man" found on Hardcore Devo: Volume One), and then we cut to Mark Mothersbaugh in a Kent State University classroom (actually the Governance Chambers), delivering a lecture. As Mothersbaugh delivers the lyrics to "Jocko Homo" (this version can also be found on Hardcore Devo: Volume One), the classroom enters a frenzy of excitement, ending in a near riot.

The film ends with a scene of Booji Boy being stabbed and his mask removed. Then the credits play in a style similarly to the title with an extremely distorted cover of "Because" by the Beatles playing. The film ends with a shot of the word "DEVO" in neon flashing off.

In popular culture
The Truth About De-Evolution was included in a collection of film shorts that toured the country. On the west coast, Slash magazine, Search & Destroy (punk zine) reprinted photos that they took off theater screens and television stations were provided copies for broadcast as publicity. Devo began sending videotapes to Saturday Night Live, after Truth About De-Evolution, but until their new manager, Elliott Roberts, also Neil Young's manager arranged a musical performance and a broadcast of a clip from The Truth About De-Evolution.

Notes

Truth About De-Evolution
Music videos